Márcio Luiz França Gomes (born 23 June 1963) is a Brazilian lawyer and politician, member of the Brazilian Socialist Party (PSB), and former governor and vice governor of São Paulo, elected with Geraldo Alckmin in 2014. França assumed the office as governor on 6 April 2018 after Alckmin resigned to run for President of Brazil in the 2018 election. França ran for re-election in 2018, but lost to João Doria by a narrow margin in the run-off.

He was the PSB nominee for Mayor of São Paulo with Antonio Neto, from PDT, as vice mayoral running mate. In the 2022 elections, França was a candidate for the Senate, while his wife Lúcia França became the running mate of Fernando Haddad in the São Paulo gubernatorial election.

References

|-

|-

|-

|-

|-

|-

|-

1963 births
Living people
People from São Vicente, São Paulo
20th-century Brazilian lawyers
Brazilian Socialist Party politicians
Government ministers of Brazil